Morata de Tajuña is a municipality of the Community of Madrid, Spain.

References

Municipalities in the Community of Madrid